The Ultimate Collection is a greatest hits compilation of recordings by American singer Donna Summer released in the United Kingdom in late 2016. The album was certified Silver in the UK.

Reception
Andy Kellman of AllMusic is one of the new people to review the compilation, giving it 4 stars and saying it "adequately rounds up Summer's biggest hits in non-chronological sequence."

Track listings
Unless listed otherwise, all tracks are presented in their 7"/single edited form.

Standard edition
"I Feel Love" [Album Version] (Bellotte, Moroder, Summer) - 5:57
"MacArthur Park" (Webb) - 3:58
"This Time I Know It's For Real" (Aitken, Stock, Summer, Waterman) - 3:37
"Hot Stuff" (Bellotte, Faltermeyer, Forsey) - 3:51
"Dinner with Gershwin" (Russell) - 4:11
"I Remember Yesterday" (Bellotte, Moroder, Summer) - 4:47
 "Bad Girls" (Esposito, Hokenson, Sudano, Summer) - 3:56
 "State of Independence" (Anderson, Vangelis) - 4:25
 "She Works Hard for the Money" (Omartian, Summer) - 4:33
 "On The Radio" (Moroder, Summer) - 4:07
 "Last Dance" (Jabara) - 3:18
"No More Tears (Enough Is Enough)" (Duet With Barbra Streisand) (Jabara, Roberts) - 4:49
"Love's Unkind" [Album Version] (Bellotte, Moroder, Summer) - 4:28
"Love to Love You Baby" (Bellotte, Moroder, Donna Summer) – 3:20
"Theme From The Deep (Down Deep Inside)" (Barry, Summer) - 4:24
"I Love You" (Bellotte, Moroder, Summer) - 3:20
"Love Is in Control (Finger on the Trigger)" (Jones, Ross, Temperton) - 3:44
"I Don't Wanna Get Hurt" [7" Remix] (Aitken, Stock, Waterman) - 3:34
"Love's About To Change My Heart" [PWL 7" Mix] (Aitken, Stock, Waterman) - 3:34

Double LP edition
A1. "I Feel Love" [Album Version] - 5:57
A2. "MacArthur Park" - 3:58
A3. "This Time I Know It's For Real" - 3:37
A4. "Hot Stuff" - 3:51
A5. "Dinner with Gershwin" - 4:11
B1. "I Remember Yesterday" - 4:47
B2. "Bad Girls" - 3:56
B3. "On The Radio" - 4:07
B4. "Heaven Knows" (featuring Brooklyn Dreams) (Bellotte, Mathieson, Moroder, Summer) - 3:54
B5. "Last Dance"- 3:18
C1. "No More Tears (Enough Is Enough)" [Duet With Barbra Streisand] - 4:49
C2. "Love's Unkind" [Album Version] - 4:28
C3. "Love to Love You Baby" – 3:20
C4. "Theme From The Deep (Down Deep Inside)" - 4:24
C5. "Could It Be Magic" (Anderson, Manilow)  – 3:56
D1. "I Love You" - 3:20
D2. "Rumour Has It" (Bellotte, Moroder, Summer) - 3:51
D3. "Love Is in Control (Finger on the Trigger)" - 3:44
D4. "I Don't Wanna Get Hurt" [7" Remix] - 3:34
D5. "Love's About To Change My Heart" [PWL 7" Mix] - 3:34

Deluxe Collector's Edition 

Disc 1 - To Dance
"I Feel Love" [Album Version] - 5:57
"MacArthur Park" - 3:58
"This Time I Know It's For Real" - 3:37
"Hot Stuff" - 3:51
"Dinner with Gershwin" - 4:11
"Bad Girls" - 3:56
"State of Independence" - 4:25
"Rumour Has It" - 3:51
"The Wanderer" - 3:45
"She Works Hard for the Money" - 4:33
"All Systems Go" (Faltermeyer, Summer) -  4:00
"On The Radio" - 4:07
"Heaven Knows" (featuring Brooklyn Dreams) - 3:54
"Sunset People" (Bellotte, Faltermeyer, Forsey) - 3:58
"Eyes" [Jellybean Remix Edit] (Summer, Michael Omartian) - 3:58
"Power Of Love" [Hani's Mixshow Edit] (Luther Vandross, Marcus Miller, Teddy Vann) - 5:45
"I'm a Fire" [Solitaire Club Mix] (Toby Gad, Summer) - 7:09
"Last Dance" - 3:18

Disc 2 - To Love
"No More Tears (Enough Is Enough)" [Duet With Barbra Streisand] - 4:49
"Love's Unkind" [Album Version] - 4:28
"Love to Love You Baby" – 3:20
"Theme From The Deep (Down Deep Inside)" - 4:24
"Could It Be Magic" – 3:56
"Try Me, I Know We Can Make It" (Bellotte, Moroder, Summer) - 4:46
"Spring Affair" (Bellotte, Moroder, Summer) - 4:02
"I Love You" - 3:20
"Unconditional Love" [with Musical Youth] (Omartian, Summer) - 3:58
 "Love Is in Control (Finger on the Trigger)" - 3:44
"I Don't Wanna Get Hurt" [7" Remix] - 3:34
"When Love Takes Over You" [Remix] - 3:38
"Breakaway" [Power Radio Mix] - 3:59
"Melody of Love (Wanna Be Loved)" (Album Version - mislabeled as "West End 7" Radio Mix") (Carrano, Clivilles, Cole, Summer) - 4:17
"Winter Melody" (Bellotte, Moroder, Summer) - 4:04
"The Woman in Me" (John Bettis, Michael Clark) – 3:55
"Back in Love Again" (Bellotte, Moroder, Summer) - 3:58
"Dim All the Lights" (Summer) - 4:23
"Cold Love" - 3:18
"Love's About To Change My Heart" [PWL 7" Mix] - 3:34

Disc 3 - To Remember
"I Remember Yesterday" [Album Version] (Bellotte, Moroder, Summer) - 4:47
"Wassermann (Aquarius)" - 3:12
"Oh, Segne Gott Mein' Seel / Bless The Lord" (From German Cast Recording Of 'Godspell') - 2:45
"Lady of the Night" (Bellotte, Moroder) - 3:58
"The Hostage" - (Pete Bellotte, Giorgio Moroder) - 4:16
"Something's Missing (In My Life)" - 5:41 (credited as "Paul Jabara featuring Special Guest Donna Summer")
"Once Upon A Time" - 4:17
"Shut Out" - 3:12 (credited as "Paul Jabara featuring Special Guest Donna Summer")
"Walk Away" - 4:31
"Never Lose Your Sense Of Humor" - 3:30 (credited as "Paul Jabara featuring Special Guest Donna Summer")
"Highway Runner" (Moroder, Summer) - 3:28
"I Feel Love" [Part 1 - Special Version Remix By Patrick Cowley] - 3:47
"Romeo" (Bellotte, Levay) - 3:18
"When Love Cries" [Radio Remix] (Keith Diamond, Larry Henley, Eve Nelson, Anthony Smith, Summer) - 4:09
"I Will Go with You (Con te partirò)" (Quarantotto, Sartori, Summer) - 4:04
"Love Is the Healer" (Eric Kupper's I Feel Healed 7" Mix) - 3:58
"I Got Your Love" [Radio Edit] (Summer, Roberts) - 3:58
"Stamp Your Feet" [Jason Nevins Radio Mix] - 3:46
"Fame (The Game)" [Dave Aude Radio] - 3:48
"To Paris with Love" [Mendy Radio Edit] - 4:00

Charts

Certifications and sales

References

External links
 

2016 compilation albums
Donna Summer compilation albums